Gaston Lachaise (March 19, 1882 – October 18, 1935) was a French-born sculptor, active in the early 20th century. A native of Paris, he was most noted for his female nudes such as Standing Woman. Gaston Lachaise was taught the refinement of European sculpture while living in France. He met a young American woman, Isabel Dutaud Nagle, and the pair moved to America, where his craft reached maturity and he was influenced and inspired by American ways. Lachaise helped redefine the female nude in a new and powerful manner. His drawings also reflected his new style of the female form.

Early life and education
Born in Paris, Lachaise was the son of Marie Barré (1856-1940), herself the daughter of a sculptor and Jean Lachaise(1848-1901), a cabinetmaker who designed furniture for the private apartment of Gustave Eiffel in the Eiffel tower, among other commissions. At age 13 he entered a craft school, the École Municipale Bernard Palissy, where he was trained in the decorative arts, and from 1898 to 1904 he studied sculpture at the École des Beaux-Arts under Gabriel-Jules Thomas. He began his artistic career as a designer of Art Nouveau decorative objects for the French jeweler René Lalique.

Move to America
Around 1902 or 1903 he met and fell in love with Isabel Dutaud Nagle (1872–1957), a married American woman of French Canadian descent (she eventually was divorced from her husband and married Lachaise). When she returned to her home near Boston in 1904, Lachaise vowed to follow her. After briefly working for the master jewelry and glass designer René Lalique in order to pay for his passage, he arrived in America in 1906, never to return to his native land. For the next fifteen years he earned a living as a sculptor's assistant. In Boston he worked for H. H. Kitson, an academic sculptor producing primarily military monuments. In 1912 Lachaise went to New York City helping Kitson in his studio at 7 MacDougal Alley. Soon after, he went to work as an assistant to the sculptor Paul Manship, while also creating his own art.  His association with Paul Manship lasted until 1921; the work of both sculptors can be seen at Rockefeller Center.

Lachaise had many studios in Greenwich village, including 20 West 8th Street (from 1924 to 1926/27, razed); 55 West 8th Street (from 1927 to 1933, still standing), and 42 Washington Mews (1933-his death, still standing). In 1922, Lachaise bought a home and studio in Georgetown, Maine, Marsden Hartley being a frequent visitor. In America, Lachaise matured into his unique style and portrayal of the female nude. He worked mostly in bronze. Lachaise's nudes were seen as strong yet gentle, husky but curvy, and seem to be referring to fertility as well. "The breasts, the abdomen, the thighs, the buttocks—upon each of these elements the sculptor lavishes a powerful and incisive massiveness, a rounded voluminousness, that answers not to the descriptions of nature but to an ideal prescribed by his own emotions."

Works

Lachaise's personal idiom was developed during the first decade of the twentieth century with his encounter with Isabel. But it was not until his arrival in New York, that he realized his principal manifesto: his concept of "Woman" as a force of nature based on his wife's image. In his own words he described his many sculpted images of the female nude in contrasting terms: vigorous, robust, and massive yet in repose, serene and eternal.

In 1918, (eight months after he became an American citizen and married Isabel), Lachaise began his meteoric rise in the New York art world with his first solo show, held at the Bourgeois Galleries, which featured his challenging, heroic-sized Woman (Elevation). 
Lachaise's most famous work, Standing Woman (modeled 1928–30, copyrighted 1932, cast ca. 1933, Museum of Modern Art, New York), typifies the image that Lachaise worked and reworked: a voluptuous female nude with sinuous, tapered limbs. Lachaise was also known as a portraitist. He executed busts of famous artists and literary celebrities, such as Georgia O'Keeffe, John Marin, Marianne Moore and Lincoln Kirstein. In 1935 the Museum of Modern Art in New York City held a retrospective exhibition of Lachaise's work, the first at that institution for any American sculptor.

Gaston Lachaise was an extremely versatile sculptor, technically expert in several media and accomplished with both ideal and commercial effort. His work was chosen for several major New York architectural commissions – including the AT&T Building and Rockefeller Center. And the more commercial aspect of his sculptural output – the production of fountains and decorative bronzes, primarily depicting animals – offered him some financial relief. Yet Lachaise's artistic legacy is closely bound to his depictions of "Woman." His late works, which are extreme in their manipulation of his ideal of the human anatomy, are erotic and emotional and avant-garde.

Called by ARTnews the "greatest American sculptor of his time", he played a critical role in the birth of American Modernism, pushing the boundaries of nude figuration with his innovative explorations of the human body.

His artistic career was cut short by his unexpected death from acute leukemia on October 18, 1935.

Collections
Public collections holding his works include:
United States:
Amon Carter Museum of American Art
Art Institute of Chicago
Addison Gallery of American Art
Brooklyn Museum of Art
Cleveland Museum of Art
Currier Museum of Art
Detroit Institute of Arts
Fine Arts Museums of San Francisco
Harvard University Art Museums
Honolulu Museum of Art
Indiana University Art Museum
Memorial Art Gallery
Metropolitan Museum of Art
Minneapolis Institute of Art
Milwaukee Art Museum
Museum of Fine Arts, Boston
Museum of Modern Art
Nasher Sculpture Center
National Portrait Gallery
New Mexico Museum of Art
Pennsylvania Academy of the Fine Arts
Phillips Collection
Sheldon Museum of Art
Smart Museum of Art
Smithsonian American Art Museum
Virginia Museum of Fine Arts
Walker Art Center
Worcester Art Museum

Australia:
 The Australian National Gallery, Canberra, Australia
 The National Gallery of Victoria (NGV), Melbourne, Australia

Czech Republic:
National Gallery Prague, Veletržní Palace, Czech Republic

France:
 Musée Courbet, Ornans, France
 Musée d'Art Modern de Paris, France
 Musée d'Art et d'Industrie de Roubaix, André Diligent, "La Piscine," France

United Kingdom:
The Tate Modern, London, UK

Foundation 
In 1963, according to the will of Lachaise's widow, Isabel, the Lachaise Foundation was established with the intention of perpetuating Gaston Lachaise's artistic legacy for the public benefit.

Since the founding of the Lachaise Foundation, the estate of the artist has been exclusively represented by the following galleries: Weyhe Gallery; Felix Landau Gallery and the Robert Schoelkopf Gallery (1962-1991); Salander-O'Reilly Galleries (1991-2007); Gerald Peters Gallery (2009-2013); David Findlay Jr. Gallery (2015-2016) until that gallery was acquired  by Wally Findlay Galleries/ Findlay Galleries (2016-2021).

See also
 Floating Figure

References

Sources
Budny, Virginia, "Gaston Lachaise's American Venus: The Genesis and Evolution of Elevation," The American Art Journal, vols. 34-35 (2003–2004), pp. 62–143.

Further reading
Mayor, A. Hyatt. "Gaston Lachaise." Hound & Horn, July-Sept. 1932, pp. [563]-564, followed by three reproductions of his sculptures and a portfolio of eight reproductions of his drawings.
Taylor, Sue. "Gaston Lachaise". Art in America, November 2013. New York: Brant Publications, Inc. pp. 183–184. (Review of 2013 Lachaise exhibition at the Portland Art Museum, Oregon.)
Silver, Ken; Paula Hornbostel; Peter Sutton. Face & Figure: The Sculpture of Gaston Lachaise, Bruce Museum, Greenwich, CT, 2012. 
Bourgeois, Louise, "Obsession"; Jean Clair, "Gaia and Gorgon"; Paula Hornbostel, "Portrait of Isabel: The Letters and Photographs of Gaston Lachaise"; Hilton Kramer, "The Passion of Gaston Lachaise" in exhibition catalogue Gaston Lachaise, 1882-1935, Editions Gallimard, published in the USA 2007.
 Joubin, Franck. Gaston Lachaise (1882-1935): un sculpteur pour l'Amérique. MA Dissertation. Paris: École du Louvre, 2015. 2 vol. (159+70 p.).

External links

The Lachaise Foundation official website
Gaston Lachaise Bio - Findlay Galleries
 
 Gaston Lachaise Collection. Yale Collection of American Literature, Beinecke Rare Book and Manuscript Library.

1882 births
1935 deaths
Modern sculptors
Artists from Paris
École des Beaux-Arts alumni
French emigrants to the United States
Art Nouveau designers
20th-century American sculptors
20th-century American male artists
American male sculptors
People from Georgetown, Maine
Deaths from leukemia
Deaths from cancer in the United States